The Armenian community of the United Kingdom consists mainly of British citizens who are fully or partially of Armenian descent. There has been sporadic emigration from Armenia to the UK since the 18th century, with the biggest influx coming after the Second World War. The majority are based in the major cities of London and Manchester. The 2001 UK Census recorded 589 Armenian-born people living in the UK, and in 2013, the Office for National Statistics estimated that there were 1,235 people born in Armenia resident in the UK, with the number of Armenian nationals being 1,720, although it has been estimated by the Armenian Diaspora Conference that there are up to 18,000 ethnic Armenians including those who are British-born, and of part Armenian descent, living in the UK.

History
Antonia Gransden (University of Nottingham) writes about the visit to the monastery of St. Albans in 1228 of the Armenian Archbishop, and in 1252 the group of Armenians. The first Armenian community in Britain was formed in Manchester in the 19th century. A mixture of textile traders, small manufacturers and retailers, in 1870 they opened the first Armenian church in Britain (the Holy Trinity Church located in Manchester). In 1896 an estimated 500 Armenians lived in London.

On 19 July 1920, Hovhannes Masehyan was appointed by the Armenian government to serve as "envoy extraordinary and minister plenipotentiary" of Armenia to Britain. However, his appointment was disallowed by the Foreign Office which felt "discomfort and embarrassment" at such a "veteran diplomat" representing an "unstable state" Britain had not yet granted de jure recognition to. On 12 November 1920, the Foreign Office (and later Lord Curzon) acknowledged the appointment of Jaques Bagratuni as the unofficial representative of Armenia in London.

Population distribution
According to Vered Amit's Armenians in London: The Management of Social Boundaries, published in 1989, around 10,000 Armenians were living in Greater London at the time. The majority were thought to be first-generation immigrants from Lebanon, Syria, Iraq, Iran and Cyprus. They also include Armenians from Ethiopia, India, Egypt, Israel, as well as individuals from other countries.

Manchester has been home to an Armenian population since 1835, with 30 Armenian businesses thought to have been operating in the city by 1862. Silk merchants were the original Armenian settlers in Manchester. In Easter 1870 Holy Trinity Church, an Armenian church, opened in Manchester, making it the first religious institution of that kind of in Western Europe. The Armenian Ladies Association of Manchester was in existence by the 1920s. In the early 20th century, there were Armenian mercantile communities based in London and Manchester represented by James Malcolm and H. Kamberian—the latter later became the official consul of Armenia in Manchester with the approval of the Foreign Office in October 1920.

Media
The Tekeyan Cultural Union published "Erebuni" from 1979 to 1996. From 1979 to 1987, it was a bilingual Armenian/English monthly, turning into a biweekly from 1987 to 1996. For a brief period in 1993, it was published solely in English before reverting into a bilingual edition. It ceased publication in 1996.

Churches
There are three Armenian Apostolic Churches in Britain: Saint Sarkis in Kensington in London; Saint Yeghiche in South Kensington, also in London; and the Holy Trinity in Chorlton-on-Medlock, Manchester. The Armenian church of the Holy Trinity was the first purpose-built Armenian church in Western Europe and was opened at Easter 1870. The architects were Royle & Bennett, 1869–70. There is also an Armenian Christian Fellowship in Chiswick, West London, a non-denominational evangelical church with services in Armenian, English and Persian. Nearby Chiswick New Cemetery has a significant number of Armenian burials.

Schools 
Kevork Tahta Armenian Community Sunday School in London operates under the auspices of Armenian Community of UK, providing inclusive education to promote a better knowledge of the Armenian language and culture.

List of notable British Armenians

 Armen Sarkissian, 4th president of Armenia 
 Levon Chilingirian OBE, musician
 Ara Darzi, Baron Darzi of Denham KBE, surgeon and first British-Armenian peer
 Dame Sonia Rosemary Susan Proudman judge of the High Court of England and Wales
 David Dickinson, antiques expert and television presenter
 Calouste Gulbenkian, one of the founders of Royal Dutch Shell and oil magnate
 Robert Istepanian, professor of Data Communication at Kingston University
 Baret Magarian, novelist
 Kevork Malikyan, actor, various TV roles including Mind Your Language, and films including Indiana Jones and the Last Crusade, Flight of the Phoenix
 Roland Manookian, actor, major role in the Football Factory by Nick Love
 Demis Ohandjanian, football player
 Kev Orkian, musician, comedian, actor
 Jordan Tchilingirian, professor of Political Science at University of Western Australia
 Alexander Raphael, first person of Armenian descent to become a member of the House of Commons
 Alexander Seifalian, professor, head of nanotechnology and regenerative medicine at University College London
 Andy Serkis, actor, director, and author best known for playing Sméagol/Gollum, in The Lord of the Rings film trilogy
 Joe Strummer, lead singer of The Clash, musician
 Dikran Tahta, mathematician and teacher

See also
 Armenia–United Kingdom relations
 Armenian diaspora
 Armenian Americans
 Armenian Canadians
 Armenian Australians
 Armenians in France
 Armenians in Italy
 Armenians in Germany
 Armenians in Sweden
 Armenians in Norway
 Ethnic groups in the United Kingdom

References

Further reading

External links
 Armenian Community and Church Council of Great Britain
 Centre for Armenian Information and Advice
 Homenetmen London Armenian Community

 
United Kingdom
Immigration to the United Kingdom by country of origin